The second season of Tangle, an Australian drama television series, began airing on 20 July 2010 on Showcase. The season consists of 6 episodes and concluded on 24 August.

The season was released on DVD as a two disc set under the title of Tangle: Series 2 on 18 November 2010.

Cast

Regular
 Justine Clarke as Ally Kovac
 Kat Stewart as Nat Manning
 Catherine McClements as Christine Williams
 Joel Tobeck as Tim Williams
 Matt Day as Gabriel Lucas
 Don Hany as Spiros Georgiades
Blake Davis as Max Williams
 Lincoln Younes as Romeo Kovac
 Eva Lazzaro as Gigi Kovac
 Kick Gurry as Joe Kovac

Recurring and guest
Tony Rickards as Billy Hall
Reef Ireland as Ned Dougherty
 Madeleine Jay as Kelly
 Georgia Flood as Charlotte Barker
 Alison Whyte as Nicky Barnham
 Kate Jenkinson as Melanie
Maude Davey as Agatha
 Tony Nikolakopoulos as Gordon
Fiona Harris as Sophie
 Ryan Corr as Isaac
 Marta Kaczmarek as Psychic
Tim Draxl as Conrad
 Adam Zwar as Huey
 Leah Vandenberg as Elle
 Jane Allsop as Tanya
 Todd MacDonald as Paul
Lucia Emmerichs as Ophelia

Episodes

Awards and nominations

Wins
 AACTA Award for Best Lead Actress in a Television Drama – Catherine McClements
 ASTRA Award for Most Outstanding Performance by an Actor: Female – Catherine McClements

Nominations
 AACTA Award for Best Lead Actress in a Television Drama – Justine Clarke
 AACTA Award for Best Television Drama Series – Tangle
 AACTA Award for Best Screenplay in Television – Fiona Seres (episode 5)
 AACTA Award for Best Direction in Television – Emma Freeman (episode 6)
 ASTRA Award for Most Outstanding Drama – Tangle
  ASTRA Award for Most Outstanding Performance by an Actor: Male – Don Hany
  ASTRA Award for Most Outstanding Performance by an Actor: Female – Justine Clarke
 IF 'Out of the Box' Award – Blake Davis
 Logie Award for Most Outstanding Actress – Justine Clarke
 Logie Award for Most Popular Actor – Don Hany
 Screen Music Award for Best Music in a Television Series or Serial – Bryony Marks (episode 6)

DVD release

References

2010 Australian television seasons